The 2019 season was the Los Angeles Rams' 82nd in the National Football League (NFL), their 83rd overall, their 53rd in the Greater Los Angeles Area and their third under head coach Sean McVay. It also marked the Rams' final season playing their home games at the Los Angeles Memorial Coliseum, as the team moved into SoFi Stadium in Inglewood beginning with the 2020 season alongside the Los Angeles Chargers. They entered the season as the defending NFC champions looking to bounce back after their Super Bowl LIII loss to the New England Patriots.

Although the Rams' temporary stadium was officially known as United Airlines Field at the Los Angeles Memorial Coliseum this season, the team removed any references to the corporate sponsor due to a team sponsorship from one of its competitors, American Airlines.

Despite starting the season at 3–0, the Rams lost 7 of their final 13 games and, after a 34–31 loss to their NFC West rival San Francisco 49ers in Week 16, were eliminated from playoff contention for the first time since 2016. This was their first non-playoff season under head coach Sean McVay.

Offseason

Coaching changes
 The Cincinnati Bengals hired Rams quarterbacks coach Zac Taylor as their new head coach February 4, 2019. Pass game coordinator Shane Waldron will assume quarterback coach responsibilities, and the Rams hired Zac Robinson as an assistant quarterbacks coach.
 The Rams hired Wes Phillips, son of Wade Phillips, as tight ends coach February 12, 2019. The younger Phillips had served in the same position with the Washington Redskins from 2014 through 2018. He had originally succeeded Sean McVay in that position after McVay was elevated to offensive coordinator.
 Eric Henderson was hired as defensive line coach, replacing Bill Johnson. Prior to joining the Rams, Henderson had served one season as assistant defensive line coach for the Los Angeles Chargers.

Roster changes

Free agents

 Blake Countess was waived by the Rams on May 2, 2019 after declining to take a pay cut on his one-year, $2.025 million tender signed the previous month.

Free agent signings

NFL Draft

Notes
 The Rams traded their second-round selection (No. 63 overall) as well as their fourth-round selection (124th) in 2018 to the Kansas City Chiefs in exchange for the Chiefs' sixth-round selection in 2018 (209th) and cornerback Marcus Peters.
 The Rams traded their third-round selection (No. 94 overall) as well as their 2020 fifth-round selection to the Jacksonville Jaguars in exchange for defensive end Dante Fowler.
 The Rams traded their seventh-round selection (245th overall) and linebacker Alec Ogletree to the New York Giants in exchange for the Giants' fourth- and sixth-round selections in 2018 (102nd and 176th).
 As the result of a negative differential of free agent signings and departures that the Rams experienced during the  free agency period, the Rams were awarded three compensatory draft picks for the 2019 NFL Draft, two in the third round (98th and 99th overall) and one in the seventh round (251st overall). The 98th pick was given to the Jacksonville Jaguars as part of the Dante Fowler trade.
 The Rams traded their first-round (31st overall) and sixth-round selections (203rd overall) to the Atlanta Falcons in exchange for the Falcons' second-round (45th overall) and third-round (79th overall) picks.
 The Rams traded their second-round pick (45th overall) acquired from Atlanta to the New England Patriots in exchange for the Patriots' second-round (56th overall), acquired from Chicago, and third-round (101st overall) selections.
 The Rams traded their second-round selection (56th overall), acquired from New England to Kansas City in exchange for the Chiefs' second-round (61st overall) and fifth-round (167th overall) pick.
 The Rams acquired a third-round pick (70th overall) from Tampa Bay, with the Buccaneers receiving two of the Rams' remaining third-round selections (94th and 99th overall.
 The Rams acquired a third-round pick (97th overall) from New England, with the Patriots receiving the Rams' remaining third-round (101st overall) and fourth-round (133rd overall selections.
 The Rams traded two fifth-round picks (162nd and 167th overall) to New England in exchange for the Patriots' fourth-round (134th overall) and seventh-round (243rd overall) selections.

Undrafted free agents

Following the 2019 NFL Draft, the Rams signed 19 undrafted rookie free agents who would compete for roster spots and participate in the team's offseason and training camp programs.

Staff

Final roster

Preseason
The Rams announced that they would host a preseason game at Aloha Stadium outside Honolulu, Hawaii. On March 21, the exhibition matchup between the Rams and the Dallas Cowboys was officially announced for Saturday, August 17. Continuing a trend he had established the previous season, head coach Sean McVay kept his established starters off the field for the entire preseason, with only his special teams unit of long snapper Jake McQuaide, punter Johnny Hekker, and kicker Greg Zuerlein in their regular season roles.

Regular season

Schedule

Notes
 Intra-division opponents are in bold text.
 For Rams home games, their home stadium reverted to its original name of Los Angeles Memorial Coliseum, and all signage indicating "United Airlines Field" was covered during games due to the franchise's sponsoring partnership with American Airlines.

Game summaries

Week 1: at Carolina Panthers

Shaking off a slow start, Todd Gurley had 97 rushing yards while Malcolm Brown added 53 yards and two touchdowns as the Rams won their season opener for the third time in as many years under head coach Sean McVay. Following a scoreless first quarter, Los Angeles took the lead on a 49-yard field goal by kicker Greg Zuerlein. Linebacker Samson Ebukam deflected a lateral attempt by Panthers quarterback Cam Newton and recovered the fumble, which helped set up a 5-yard touchdown run by Brown and a 10-0 Rams lead. Both L.A. and Carolina traded field goals before halftime. Zuerlein added his third field goal and Brown added a second touchdown in the third quarter as the Rams held a 23-13 advantage going into the fourth quarter. Gurley, who was held to only eight yards on five carries in the first half, had 89 yards on nine attempts in the second half and helped to set up the Rams' final score, a 5-yard touchdown pass from quarterback Jared Goff to tight end Tyler Higbee. Goff completed 23 of 39 passes for 186 yards, while wide receiver Robert Woods led the team in receptions (eight) and receiving yards (70). Making his return to the lineup after a season-ending injury in 2018, wide receiver Cooper Kupp had seven receptions for 46 yards. On defense, linebacker Cory Littleton had an interception, a forced fumble and fumble recovery to go along with his team-high eight tackles, while fellow linebacker Dante Fowler added a pair of sacks and Clay Matthews III had another in his first game with the Rams. Another new Ram, safety Eric Weddle, was taken out of the game in the second quarter following a collision with Panthers running back Christian McCaffrey that resulted in a head laceration.

Week 2: vs. New Orleans Saints

Playing their home opener at the renovated Los Angeles Memorial Coliseum for the final time, the Rams hosted the Saints in a rematch of the 2018 NFC Championship Game and came away with a convincing victory. The game featured a strong defensive effort by both teams in the first half and early in the third quarter, as they traded two field goals each, with Rams kicker Greg Zuerlein connecting on attempts from 24 and 22 yards in the first half. A possible touchdown for the Saints after DE Cameron Jordan stripped Goff and returned the fumble for a score was controversially blown dead. With the score tied at 6–6 midway through the third quarter, the Rams mounted a 10-play, 75-yard drive that ended with a 4-yard touchdown run by Todd Gurley to give them a 13–6 advantage. After the Rams defense had back-to-back sacks to force a Saints punt, JoJo Natson returned the kick 32 yards to set the Rams up at the New Orleans 26. Three rushes for 16 yards by running back Malcolm Brown put the Rams on the 2-yard line and quarterback Jared Goff connected with wide receiver Brandin Cooks for the score. Following a Saints field goal early in the fourth quarter, the Rams faced third-and-2 from their own 33 when Goff hit wide receiver Cooper Kupp, who broke four tackles as he weaved through the Saints defense for a spectacular 66-yard catch-and-run before being brought down inches from the goal line. On the next play from scrimmage, Goff scored on a quarterback sneak to end the day's scoring. Kupp had five receptions for 120 yards, both team highs, in his first game back at the Coliseum since suffering a torn ACL there 10 months earlier. Goff completed 19 of 28 passes for 283 yards and two scores with no interceptions, and Gurley had 63 yards on 16 carries with one touchdown. Defensively, safety Eric Weddle and linebacker Cory Littleton shared the team lead in tackles with five each, while linebacker Clay Matthews and defensive end Michael Brockers each had a sack. Strong safety John Johnson added four tackles and an interception of Saints quarterback Drew Brees, who left the game in the first quarter with a hand injury and did not return. The Rams began their 38th and final season at the Coliseum, as they will move to SoFi Stadium in nearby Inglewood in 2020. The official name of the Rams' future stadium was announced earlier in the day on the Fox NFL Sunday pregame show.

Week 3: at Cleveland Browns

Safety John Johnson's end zone interception of Browns quarterback Baker Mayfield with 27 seconds remaining capped a successful goal line stand as the Rams improved to 3–0 with their first win on Sunday Night Football in 14 years. Los Angeles took a first quarter lead on a 53-yard field goal by Greg Zuerlein, but fell behind for the first time in the season after giving up a pair of field goals to Browns kicker Austin Seibert. Jared Goff completed 24 of 38 passes for 269 yards with two touchdown passes to wide receiver Cooper Kupp, who finished with a team-high 11 receptions for 102 yards, while fellow wide receiver Brandin Cooks added eight receptions for 112 yards. Johnson led the Rams with nine tackles, with safety Eric Weddle and defensive end Michael Brockers adding six tackles each. Linebacker Clay Matthews III had three tackles with two sacks, a forced fumble, and a pass deflection playing in front of a FirstEnergy Stadium crowd that witnessed his father and namesake Clay Matthews Jr. be inducted into the Cleveland Browns Ring of Honor. The younger Matthews joined his family during the final moments of the halftime ceremony. The Rams won a Sunday Night game for the first time since a 20–10 victory over the Dallas Cowboys that was played on January 1, 2006, the final week of the 2005 NFL season.

Week 4: vs. Tampa Bay Buccaneers

Jared Goff set personal bests for passing attempts, completions, and yards, but also had four turnovers (all of which led directly to Tampa Bay touchdowns) as the Rams lost for the first time in the season. Host Los Angeles fell behind 21–0 early in the second quarter and spent the rest of the day trying to catch up, as Goff tied a league record with 45 pass completions (Drew Bledsoe, New England vs. Minnesota, 1994), and his 68 pass attempts tied for third-most in league history (George Blanda, Houston vs. Buffalo, 1964; Jon Kitna, Cincinnati vs. Pittsburgh, 2001). In addition to his new team records for single game attempts and completions, which broke marks previously held by Marc Bulger (vs. New York Giants, 2005), Goff's 517 passing yards tied with Tom Brady (New England vs. Miami, 2011) for the eighth-highest single-game total in NFL records, and was exceeded only by Norm Van Brocklin's league-record 554 yards against the New York Yanks in 1951 for the highest total in team history. However, Goff threw three interceptions and then fumbled once with just over a minute remaining when he was sacked and stripped of the ball by Buccaneers linebacker Shaquil Barrett, with defensive tackle Ndamukong Suh picking it up and running it 37 yards for the touchdown to seal the victory against his former team. Wide receiver Robert Woods had a career-high 13 receptions for 164 yards, while Cooper Kupp added nine catches for 121 yards and a touchdown and running back Todd Gurley had seven receptions for 54 yards. Though Gurley scored two rushing touchdowns, he ran the ball a career-low five times for only 16 yards as the large early deficit led the Rams to abandon the running game (11 attempts, 28 yards). Safety Eric Weddle had 15 tackles to lead the Rams, and cornerback Marcus Peters picked off a Jameis Winston pass and returned it 32 yards for a touchdown in the fourth quarter.

Week 5: at Seattle Seahawks

Greg Zuerlein's 44-yard field goal attempt went wide right with 11 seconds remaining, and the Rams' comeback bid fell short at CenturyLink Field. Zuerlein ended L.A.'s first two drives with field goals of 47 and 32 yards for a 6–0 first-quarter lead. After Seahawks quarterback Russell Wilson threw two touchdowns to put his team up 14–6, Jared Goff guided the Rams on an eight-play, 62-yard drive that was capped with a 9-yard touchdown pass from Goff to wide receiver Cooper Kupp, who finished with a team-high nine receptions for 117 yards. In the second half, running back Todd Gurley (15 carries, 51 yards) scored two rushing touchdowns and Zuerlein added his third field goal (36 yards) to give the Rams a 29–24 advantage with less than 10 minutes to play in the fourth quarter, but Wilson led his team to the go-ahead touchdown with just over two minutes remaining. Tight end Gerald Everett had a career single-game best seven receptions for 136 yards, and caught three passes for 46 yards on the Rams' final drive to set up Zuerlein's fourth and final attempt of the day, which just missed the upright and denied L.A.'s bid for a third straight win at Seattle (and fourth in five years). Goff completed 29 of 49 passes for 395 with one touchdown and one interception. Making his first professional NFL start, rookie free agent linebacker Troy Reeder led the Rams with 13 tackles (eight solo) and linebacker Clay Matthews III had five tackles, including a sack, but was flagged for a questionable roughing the passer penalty that kept the Seahawks' final scoring drive alive. With the loss, the Rams fell to 3–2 on the season, while the Seahawks improved to 4–1.

Week 6: vs. San Francisco 49ers

A critical turnover broke open a tie game in the second half as the 49ers shut down the Rams' offense in a key NFC West battle at the Coliseum. Los Angeles fell to 3–3, losing three games in a row for the first time in the Sean McVay era. Quarterback Jared Goff, who two weeks earlier had passed for a career-high 517 yards in a loss to Tampa Bay, was held to a career-low 78 passing yards and was sacked four times. Playing without Todd Gurley, the Rams running game started fast on its opening drive, going 56 yards on seven plays (all runs) with wide receiver Robert Woods scoring a touchdown from eight yards out to give Los Angeles an early 7–0 lead; however, Gurley's replacement, Malcolm Brown, who rushed five times for 40 yards on the opening drive, was held to four carries and one yard for the remainder of the game, and failed twice to score from the 1-yard line in a second-quarter goal-line stand. Rookie running back Darrell Henderson saw his first significant playing time of the season, carrying three times for 40 yards to set up that second-quarter scoring opportunity, but he failed to handle Goff's pitchout on the first play of the second half, and four plays later, the 49ers went ahead for good. The San Francisco defense held the Rams to only seven rushing yards on seven attempts after halftime, and gave up only one pass play of more than nine yards in the entire game. In addition, the Rams offense went 0-for-15 on third and fourth down. The Rams defense was led by linebacker Cory Littleton, who had 14 tackles and a fumble recovery, and defensive tackle Aaron Donald, who had two sacks of 49ers quarterback Jimmy Garoppolo, including a forced fumble. The Rams held San Francisco's then-No. 1-ranked rushing offense to just 99 yards on 41 rushing plays. Cornerback Marcus Peters had four tackles and an interception in his final game with the Rams before being traded to the Baltimore Ravens two days later.

Week 7: at Atlanta Falcons

The Rams produced five sacks and forced three turnovers and snapped a five-game losing streak to Atlanta dating back to 2007 to improve to 4-3 on the season. Edge rusher Dante Fowler had a career-high three sacks among his team-leading seven total tackles (six solo) along with a pass deflection and a forced fumble. In his first game with the Rams following a midseason trade with the Jacksonville Jaguars, cornerback Jalen Ramsey had four tackles and a forced fumble. On offense, quarterback Jared Goff (268 yards) passed for two touchdowns and ran for another, while Robert Woods led the Rams with five receptions for 80 yards. Running back Todd Gurley contributed 41 yards rushing and had his first TD reception of the season, and the Rams allowed no sacks and were turnover-free for the first time in 2019. Kicker Greg Zuerlein had three field goals, while punter Johnny Hekker connected on a 23-yard pass to Nick Scott on a fake punt to help up a Rams score.

Week 8: vs. Cincinnati Bengals
NFL London Games

Wide receiver Cooper Kupp caught seven passes for a career-high 220 yards and a touchdown to lead the Rams to their first win over the Bengals since 2003. Kupp, who had five catches for 165 yards in the first half alone, scored on a wild double-reverse flea-flicker play midway through the second quarter in which he took a handoff from quarterback Jared Goff going right, then handed the ball to fellow wide receiver Robert Woods going left, who then tossed it back to a waiting Goff, who found Kupp breaking free down the right sideline for the touchdown that put the Rams ahead for good. Goff completed 17 of 31 passes for 372 yards and two touchdowns (while also not committing a turnover or being sacked for the second straight game), while wide receiver Josh Reynolds had three receptions for 73 yards, including a 31-yard touchdown, playing in relief of starter Brandin Cooks, who suffered a concussion on the Rams' opening drive and did not return to the game. Rookie safety Taylor Rapp led the defense with 12 tackles, while the Rams combined for five sacks on the day. Head coach Sean McVay remained undefeated (10-0) against AFC opponents during the regular season, getting the win over Bengals head coach Zac Taylor, who spent the two previous seasons on McVay's staff as a Rams assistant coach. The game also marked a significant milestone for Rams offensive tackle Andrew Whitworth, a 14-year NFL veteran who spent his first 11 seasons playing for the Bengals. With the victory, Whitworth became only the 12th starter in league history to earn victories over all 32 NFL teams.

Week 10: at Pittsburgh Steelers

In a sloppy game marred by 10 penalties and costly turnovers, the Rams fell to the host Steelers in a defensive battle at Heinz Field. Linebacker Dante Fowler gave Los Angeles a 7-0 lead just 14 seconds into the game when a shotgun snap went over Steelers quarterback Mason Rudolph's head. Fowler easily scooped up the ball and ran 26 yards for his first career NFL touchdown. While Pittsburgh was able to tie the score with a touchdown at the end of the first quarter, the Rams continued to struggle on offense in the first half, ending their first five offensive drives in Johnny Hekker punts. The sixth drive ended disastrously just after the two-minute warning, when quarterback Jared Goff was hit as he attempted to get rid of the ball, which was then picked up by Steelers cornerback Minkah Fitzpatrick who returned it 43 yards to put the Steelers ahead 14-7. The Rams turned over the ball twice in the third quarter before mounting an 11-play, 76-yard drive that ended with a 30-yard field goal by kicker Greg Zuerlein just before the end of the period. Early in the fourth quarter, the Rams pulled to within 14-12 when defensive tackle Aaron Donald (making his first appearance as a pro in Pittsburgh, where he played his high school and college football) sacked Rudolph in the end zone for a safety. But the Steelers were able to convert a field goal to increase their lead to 17-12 and the Rams' final drive ended with Goff throwing his second interception of the day with under 30 seconds remaining. Tight end Gerald Everett caught a team-high eight receptions for 68 yards and wide receiver Robert Woods had seven receptions for 95 yards. Running back Todd Gurley ran for 72 yards on just 12 carries, but didn't carry the ball at all during the fourth quarter. Linebacker Cory Littleton had 13 combined tackles, while Donald had six total tackles, including three for losses, including a safety.

Week 11: vs. Chicago Bears

Todd Gurley matched his season-high with 97 rushing yards on 25 carries, including 1-yard touchdown run late in the first half as the Rams bounced back with a victory over the Bears before a Sunday Night Football audience. Despite turning over the ball on offense on the first two drives, host Los Angeles held firm on defense, forcing Chicago to turn over the ball on downs on one drive and ending with missed field goals on two others. Greg Zuerlein converted a 38-yard field goal for the game's first points, and cornerback Troy Hill intercepted a pass from Bears quarterback Mitchell Trubisky to help set up a 50-yard pass from Jared Goff to wide receiver Cooper Kupp that ended just short of the goal line. Gurley himself ran it in one play later to give the Rams a 10-0 lead at halftime. The Bears were able to pull within three points after a Trubisky touchdown pass, the Rams were able to extend their lead back to 10 points as running back Malcolm Brown scored on a 5-yard run midway through the fourth period for the Rams' final points. Gurley added 36 yards on three receptions, which tied both Kupp and Josh Reynolds for the team lead on a quiet production day in which the Rams mustered only 283 total yards on offense. Rookie safety Taylor Rapp led the Rams with eight total tackles, while Aaron Donald had two sacks and was named NFC Defensive Player of the Week as Los Angeles improved to 6-4 on the season.

Week 12: vs. Baltimore Ravens
 
In front of a nationwide audience on Monday Night Football, the Rams suffered the worst home loss in franchise history as the visiting Ravens dominated all phases of the game. Baltimore became the fourth team in the 21st century to score touchdowns on their first six drives in a game, as quarterback Lamar Jackson completed 15 of 20 passes for 169 yards and five touchdowns, while also running for 95 yards on only eight carries. Todd Gurley carried the ball only six times for 22 yards, while Jared Goff passed for 212 yards with two interceptions. Kicker Greg Zuerlein's two-second quarter field goals represented all of the scoring for the Rams in their biggest defeat in Los Angeles since a 52-14 loss to Chicago in 1963, and their worst loss under head coach Sean McVay. It was also the Rams' first loss wearing their yellow color rush uniforms after four previous victories.

Week 13: at Arizona Cardinals

The Rams bounced back from the Ravens' loss with their fifth straight win at Arizona. Quarterback Jared Goff, who did not throw a single touchdown during the month of November, turned in his best performance of the year completing 32 of 43 passes for 424 yards and two touchdowns, earning NFC Offensive Player of the Week honors for the third time in his career. Tight end Tyler Higbee caught seven passes for 107 yards and a touchdown, while Robert Woods had 13 receptions for 172 yards, both single-game career highs for the veteran wide receiver. Running back Todd Gurley added 95 rushing yards and a touchdown on 19 carries as the Rams built a 27-0 lead midway through the third quarter. Defensively, Los Angeles was equally dominant, combining for six sacks of Cardinals quarterback Kyler Murray. Under constant pressure throughout the game, Murray rushed a pass that was picked off by rookie safety Taylor Rapp, who returned his first career interception 31 yards for a touchdown and a 34-7 Rams lead. Aaron Donald had 1.5 sacks, while linebacker Cory Littleton led the team with eight total tackles, including a sack.

Week 14: vs. Seattle Seahawks

Playing again at home in front of a national TV audience for the third time in four weeks, the Rams boosted their record to 8-5 with a strong Sunday Night Football win over the visiting Seahawks. After giving up a field goal to Seattle, the Rams took the lead for good on Malcolm Brown's 1-yard touchdown run with just over five minutes left in the first quarter, capping off an 8-play, 75-yard drive. In the second period, Jared Goff threw touchdown passes to wide receivers Robert Woods and Cooper Kupp, the latter coming with 51 seconds remaining to give Los Angeles a 21-3 lead. The Rams offense sputtered in the third period as Goff threw interceptions on his team's first two drives, including one returned 55 yards by safety Quandre Diggs for a Seattle touchdown. At the start of the fourth quarter, Goff found tight end Tyler Higbee for a 32-yard gain on a screen pass to spark a drive. Woods caught a 20-yard pass, then ran twice for 29 yards to give the Rams a first-and-goal at the Seattle 7. From there, Todd Gurley scored his ninth rushing touchdown of the season, finishing the play-off with a stiff-arm of Seahawks cornerback Tre Flowers. Gurley finished with 79 yards on 23 carries, while Higbee led the Rams on offense with seven receptions for 116 yards. On defense, linebacker Cory Littleton had 10 total tackles (eight solo) while fellow linebacker Samson Ebukam had two of the Rams' five sacks of Seahawks quarterback Russell Wilson.

Week 15: at Dallas Cowboys

The Rams' playoff hopes suffered a devastating blow as the host Cowboys took control with three unanswered touchdowns in the second quarter. After Jared Goff's 2-yard touchdown pass to Todd Gurley tied the score at 7-7, Dallas wide receiver Tavon Austin haunted his former team with a 59-yard touchdown reception from Dak Prescott. Cowboys running back Ezekiel Elliott then scored two touchdowns in the quarter's final two minutes, the first a 1-yard run to cap off a 14-play, 97-yard drive, and the second coming four plays after a Goff interception to put Dallas ahead 28-7 at halftime. Elliott (24 carries, 117 yards) and fellow running back Tony Pollard (12 carries, 131 yards) helped the Cowboys dominate offensively. For the Rams, Gurley scored a rushing touchdown while Goff threw a TD pass to Cooper Kupp in the game's final minute. Tight end Tyler Higbee caught 12 passes for 111 yards, while on defense the Rams were held without a sack.

Week 16: at San Francisco 49ers

Taking on the NFC's top team, the Rams battled the 49ers in a wild showdown, but critical errors in the final minute of both halves doomed Los Angeles, which was eliminated from the playoff race with the loss. Wide receiver Brandin Cooks scored only his second touchdown of the season on the Rams' opening drive on a 10-yard pass from Jared Goff, while Todd Gurley added another score on a 5-yard touchdown run on the first play of the second quarter. Gurley scored again on a 1-yard run midway through the second period, giving him 58 rushing touchdowns for his career, tying him with Hall of Fame predecessor Marshall Faulk for the most in Rams franchise history. With a 21-10 lead, the Rams seemed poised for an upset, but after the defense gave up a touchdown run to Raheem Mostert, Goff threw an interception to 49er linebacker Fred Warner, who ran untouched 46 yards to put San Francisco in front 24-21 just 46 seconds before halftime. The Rams reclaimed the lead late in the third period as Goff connected with wide receiver Cooper Kupp for a 22-yard scoring pass. The 49ers answered with tight end George Kittle's 7-yard touchdown pass from quarterback Jimmy Garoppolo midway through the fourth quarter to lead 31-28. Greg Zuerlein's 52-yard field goal tied the game at 31-31 with 2:30 remaining, but the 49ers prevailed as they twice converted on third-and-16 plays. Garoppolo, who was sacked six times, hit eight times and intercepted twice, made both clutch throws, the last one a 46-yard completion down the middle to wide receiver Emmanuel Sanders which set up kicker Robbie Gould's successful 33-yard field goal as time ran out. Goff passed for 323 yards, but his pick six late in the second quarter proved costly. Wide receiver Robert Woods had eight receptions for 117 yards, while tight end Tyler Higbee had nine catches for 104 yards, his fourth straight game over 100 yards. Defensively, Rams' linebacker Dante Fowler had 2.5 sacks and Jalen Ramsey added an interception, but a blown coverage by rookie safety Taylor Rapp gave the 49ers their final scoring opportunity. With the loss, the Rams fell to 8–7 and were eliminated from playoff contention for the first time since 2016 and for the first time under Sean McVay as the head coach. It was also the last game the team wore their white St. Louis color scheme jerseys.

Week 17: vs. Arizona Cardinals

The Rams avoided the mistakes that had plagued them the entire season to end 2019 with a victory in the team's final game played at the Los Angeles Memorial Coliseum. Quarterback Jared Goff passed for 319 yards and three touchdowns to three different receivers. Running back Malcolm Brown added the other Rams touchdown, while kicker Greg Zuerlein converted a 47-yard field goal on L.A.'s opening drive. Punter Johnny Hekker punted four times and had three downed inside the 20, a performance which earned him NFC Special Teams Player of the Week honors for Week 17. Safety Eric Weddle had seven tackles to lead the Rams on defense. Safety Taylor Rapp and cornerback Darious Williams both had interceptions of Cardinals rookie quarterback Kyler Murray, who also lost two fumbles (one recovered by Rapp, the other by linebacker Cory Littleton) as the Rams recorded their sixth straight win versus Arizona. With the victory the Rams finished 9-7, an identical record to the 1979 season, when the Rams last bade farewell to the Coliseum (losing their final game at home 29-14 to New Orleans). In their four-year return, the Rams finished with a 16–15 record at the venue (including playoffs). After starting 4-11 the first two seasons (including a playoff loss in 2017 to the Atlanta Falcons), the Rams went 12-4 their final two years at home (including their 2018 win against the Dallas Cowboys in the Divisional Round of the playoffs), with a 4–3 mark in 2019. A special logo noting the Rams' history at the Coliseum was worn by Rams players for the game and also was painted at midfield along with classic blue and yellow patterns in the end zone reflecting the team's past in the stadium, which it called home for 38 total seasons.

Standings

Division

Conference

Awards and honors

References

External links
 

Los Angeles Rams
Los Angeles Rams seasons
Los Angeles Rams
2019 in Los Angeles